Half-hanging is a method of torture, usually inflicted to force information from the victim, in which a rope is pulled tightly around the victim’s neck and then slackened when the victim becomes unconscious. The victim is revived and the process repeated. 

During the Irish Rebellion of 1798 against British rule in Ireland, government forces, in particular the militia and yeomanry, frequently used half-hanging against suspected rebels. A prominent victim of half-hanging was Anne Devlin, the housekeeper of Robert Emmet.

See also 
 Hanging
 Waterboarding
 John Smith (housebreaker), who earned the nickname Half-hanged Smith after surviving a sentence of hanging

References 

Corporal punishments
Hanging
Irish Rebellion of 1798
Physical torture techniques
Suffering
Torture